ISO/TR 11941:1996 is a Korean romanization system used in ISO. It is not commonly used.  One example of its use is in Unicode character names. The standard was withdrawn in December 2013.

It appears to be modelled on the Revised Romanization, cf. the vowels.

Transcription rules

Consonants

Vowels

Usage 
This system is used in Unicode character names. For example, the character ᄎ (U+110E) is named "HANGUL CHOSEONG CHIEUCH" (한글 초성 치읓); ㅊ is romanized as "ch." However, the character 차 (U+CC28) is named "HANGUL SYLLABLE CA"; ㅊ is romanized as "c."

External links 
 ISO/TR 11941:1996

Romanization of Korean
11941
11941